Maya Ray Thurman Hawke (born July 8, 1998) is an American actress and singer-songwriter. The daughter of actors Uma Thurman and Ethan Hawke, she began her career in modeling. She made her screen debut as Jo March in the 2017 BBC adaptation of Little Women. 

Hawke gained recognition for starring as Robin Buckley in the Netflix science fiction series Stranger Things (2019–present), and has appeared in the films Once Upon a Time in Hollywood (2019), Fear Street Part One: 1994 (2021), and Do Revenge (2022). As a musician, she has released the albums Blush (2020) and Moss (2022).

Early life 
Hawke was born on July 8, 1998, in New York City, the older of two children born to actors Ethan Hawke and Uma Thurman. Her parents met on the set of Gattaca (1997), married in May 1998, and divorced in 2005. Hawke has a brother. She also has two half-sisters by her father's second wife, Ryan Shawhughes. She has another half-sister from her mother's ex-fiancé, financier Arpad Busson.

On her father's side, Hawke is a distant cousin of playwright Tennessee Williams. On her mother's side, she is a granddaughter of Buddhist scholar Robert Thurman and model Baroness Nena von Schlebrügge. Schlebrügge's mother, Birgit Holmquist, was also a model, having posed for Axel Ebbe's statue Famntaget, currently in Smygehuk in Sweden.

Hawke has dyslexia, which resulted in her changing schools frequently during her primary education before she was finally enrolled at Saint Ann's School, a private school in Brooklyn, New York that emphasizes artistic creativity and does not grade work. The artistic environment eventually led her to acting. Hawke also took part in summer studies at the Royal Academy of Dramatic Art in London and the Stella Adler Studio of Acting in New York. She studied toward a BFA in acting at the Juilliard School for one year before dropping out after accepting her role in Little Women.

Career

Modeling
Like both her mother and grandmother, Hawke modeled for Vogue at the beginning of her career. She was also chosen as the face of the British fashion retailer AllSaints' 2016/2017 collection. In 2017, she starred as one of several faces in a video campaign for Calvin Klein's underwear range, directed by Sofia Coppola. In September, 2022, Hawke modelled for Calvin Klein's FW22 Underwear campaign.

Acting 
Hawke was Sofia Coppola's choice to play the title role of The Little Mermaid in Universal Pictures's planned live-action adaptation. However, the producers preferred actress Chloë Grace Moretz. This and other conflicts ultimately led to Coppola leaving the project. Moretz eventually dropped out as well.

Hawke made her acting debut in 2017 as Jo March in the BBC miniseries adaptation of Little Women. In September 2018, she starred in thriller Ladyworld, directed by Amanda Kramer. Hawke later broke out with her performance as Robin Buckley in the third season of Netflix's Stranger Things, which released in 2019. Also that year, Hawke played Linda Kasabian/'Flowerchild' in Quentin Tarantino's Once Upon a Time in Hollywood, and co-starred in Marc Meyers' thriller film Human Capital, which is based on Stephen Amidon's 2004 novel of the same name.

In 2020, Hawke starred in Gia Coppola's sophomore film, Mainstream, alongside Andrew Garfield. In the same year, she guest starred in the fifth episode of the miniseries The Good Lord Bird, which stars her father, Ethan Hawke. She stars as Annie Brown, the daughter of her father's character. In June, she appeared in Italian Studies, written and directed by Adam Leon and co-starring Vanessa Kirby. It premiered in the Tribeca Film Festival and later released on January 14, 2022. Later that month, she appeared as Heather in the Netflix horror film Fear Street Part One: 1994. In 2021, she also starred in a spin-off podcast series based on her Stranger Things character, Rebel Robin: Surviving Hawkins. She starred in another scripted podcast series, The Playboy Interview, in which she plays Helen Gurley Brown.

In 2022 Hawke starred in Netflix's dark comedy film Do Revenge alongside Camila Mendes. In April 2022, she was cast in Bradley Cooper's biographical film about Leonard Bernstein, Maestro, co-starring Cooper and Carey Mulligan. In May, it was reported that she had been cast in the upcoming film The Kill Room alongside her mother Uma Thurman and Samuel L. Jackson. In July, it was announced that she would guest star in Disney's Moon Girl and Devil Dinosaur, which premiered in 2023. She is also set to appear in Wes Anderson's upcoming romantic dramedy Asteroid City.

Music 
Hawke has said that folk music has influenced her music career including artists like Leonard Cohen, Patti Smith and Joni Mitchell. She takes inspiration from "great lyricists" like Cohen and Bob Dylan as, according to her, "music is the best way to communicate poetry". 

In August 2019, Hawke released her first two singles, "To Love a Boy" and "Stay Open". The songs were written and recorded by Hawke and Grammy Award-winning singer-songwriter Jesse Harris. Hawke performed a series of headlining gigs around New York City in early 2020, her first ever solo live performances as a musician. In each of these shows, Hawke was supported by Benjamin Lazar Davis, Tōth, Will Graefe and Nick Cianci respectively. On March 18, 2020, Hawke released the first single "By Myself" and announced her debut album titled Blush amid the 2020 Black Lives Matter protests. Hawke wrote, "I feel like this is not a time for self-promotion. It is a time for activation, education and self-examination." The album's second single, "Coverage", was released on April 22, 2020, before its music video directed by Maya's father Ethan Hawke was released on the 28th. Initially set for release on June 19, 2020, Blush was delayed to August 21, 2020  To support the release of Blush, Hawke appeared as a musical guest for the first time in her career on The Today Show in late August 2020.

On June 29, 2022, alongside the release of the single "Thérèse", Hawke announced her second album Moss, which was released on September 23, 2022.

Filmography

Film

Television

Music videos

Podcast

Discography

Studio albums 
 Blush (2020)
 Moss (2022)

Singles

Awards and nominations
For her work on Stranger Things, Hawke was nominated for Outstanding Performance by an Ensemble in a Drama Series at the 26th Screen Actors Guild Awards.

References

External links

1998 births
Living people
21st-century American actresses
Actresses from New York City
American film actresses
American television actresses
Mom + Pop Music artists
Female models from New York (state)
Juilliard School alumni
Alumni of RADA
Stella Adler Studio of Acting alumni
Saint Ann's School (Brooklyn) alumni
Actors with dyslexia